Bristol College may refer to:

 City of Bristol College, Bristol, UK
 Bristol College, an Episcopal college at, Bristol, Pennsylvania, active between 1833 and 1837
 University College, Bristol
 Trinity College, Bristol
 Wesley College, Bristol

See also
:Category:Further education colleges in Bristol